Miss Chile Project was a reality TV program produced and transmitted by Canal 13 in Chile and also the 39th Miss World Chile pageant. It was hosted by Tonka Tomicic. The program showed the life of twenty ladies who competed to win Miss World Chile title and compete on Miss World 2013 pageant. Camila Recabarren of La Serena crowned Camila Andrade of Concepción.

Candidates 
{| class="wikitable" style="margin:1em auto;"
|-
!width="320"|Candidate
!width="20"|Age
!width="180"|Height
!width="180"|Result 
!width="150"|Previous result
!width="50"|Duration
|-
|bgcolor=""| Camila AndradeEx contestant of Calle 7.
| align="center" |22
| align="center" |
| style="background:Gold;color:Black;text-align:center;"| Winnerof Miss Chile Project
|bgcolor="gray"|
|bgcolor="khaki" style="text-align: center;" |13 ep.
|-
|bgcolor=""| Renata BarchiesiMedicine Student.
| align="center" |23
| align="center" |
2nd Placeof Miss Chile Project
|bgcolor="gray"|
|bgcolor="khaki" style="text-align: center;" |13 ep.
|-
|bgcolor=""| Romina LancelottiGraduated of chemical engineering.
| align="center" |23
| align="center" |
| style="background:#8c6b4d;color:Black; text-align:center;" | 3rd Placeof Miss Chile Project
|bgcolor="gray"|
|bgcolor="khaki" style="text-align: center;" |13 ep.
|-
|bgcolor=""| Dahyanna VásquezModel.
| align="center" |22
| align="center" |
| style="background:Goldenrod;color:Black; text-align:center;" | Eliminated Finalistof Miss Chile Project
|bgcolor="gray"|
|bgcolor="khaki" style="text-align: center;" |13 ep.
|-
|bgcolor=""| Marcia HerreraCommunication Student.
| align="center" |19
| align="center" |
| style="background:Goldenrod;color:Black; text-align:center;" | Eliminated Finalistof Miss Chile Project
|style="background:Red;color:White;" align=center|2nd Eliminatedof Miss Chile Project
|bgcolor="khaki" style="text-align: center;" |7 ep.
|-
|bgcolor=""| Joanna FerrariBusiness Boss.
| align="center" |24
| align="center" |
| style="background:Goldenrod;color:Black; text-align:center;" | Eliminated Finalistof Miss Chile Project
|bgcolor="gray"|
|bgcolor="khaki" style="text-align: center;" |13 ep.
|-
|bgcolor=""| Florencia DunnageCivil Engineering Student.
| align="center" |19
| align="center" |
| style="background:Goldenrod;color:Black; text-align:center;" | Eliminated Finalistof Miss Chile Project
|bgcolor="gray"|
|bgcolor="khaki" style="text-align: center;" |13 ep.
|-
|bgcolor=""| Francisca CañasStudent.
| align="center" |18
| align="center" |
| style="background:Goldenrod;color:Black;  text-align:center;" | Eliminated  Finalistof Miss Chile Project
|bgcolor="gray"|
|bgcolor="khaki" style="text-align: center;" |13 ep.
|-
|bgcolor=""| Charlotte MolinaPromoter.
| align="center" |18
| align="center" |
| style="background:Red;color:White; text-align:center;" | 12th eliminatedof Miss Chile Project
|bgcolor="gray"|
|bgcolor="khaki" style="text-align: center;" |12 ep.
|-
|bgcolor=""| Fernanda FigueroaFashion design Student.
| align="center" |18
| align="center" |
| style="background:Red;color:White; text-align:center;" | 11th eliminatedof Miss Chile Project
|bgcolor="gray"|
|bgcolor="khaki" style="text-align: center;" |12 ep.
|-
|bgcolor=""| Francesca BarisonKinesiology Student.
| align="center" |19
| align="center" |
| style="background:Red;color:White; text-align:center;" | 10th eliminatedof Miss Chile Project
|bgcolor="gray"|
|bgcolor="khaki" style="text-align: center;" |11 ep.
|-
|bgcolor=""| Catalina SalazarOcupational therapy Student.
| align="center" |18
| align="center" |
| style="background:Red;color:White; text-align:center;" | 9th eliminatedof Miss Chile Project
|bgcolor="gray"|
|bgcolor="khaki" style="text-align: center;" |10 ep.
|-
|bgcolor=""| Eileen PérezNutrition Student.
| align="center" |22
| align="center" |
| style="background:Red;color:White; text-align:center;" | 8th eliminatedof Miss Chile Project
|bgcolor="gray"|
|bgcolor="khaki" style="text-align: center;" |8 ep.
|-
|bgcolor=""| Javiera SantanderJournalism Student.
| align="center" |21
| align="center"|
| style="background:Red;color:White; text-align:center;" | 7th eliminatedof Miss Chile Project
|bgcolor="gray"|
|bgcolor="khaki" style="text-align: center;" |7 ep.
|-
|bgcolor=""| Rocío GómezPublicity Student.
| align="center" |20
| align="center" |
| style="background:Red;color:White; text-align:center;" | 6th eliminatedof Miss Chile Project
|bgcolor="gray"|
|bgcolor="khaki" style="text-align: center;" |6 ep.
|-
|bgcolor=""| Ruth VerasKinesiology Student.
| align="center" |21
| align="center" |
| style="background:Red;color:White; text-align:center;" | 5th eliminatedof Miss Chile Project
|bgcolor="gray"|
|bgcolor="khaki" style="text-align: center;" |5 ep.
|-
|bgcolor=""| Constanza MaturanaStudent.
| align="center" |18
| align="center" |
| style="background:Red;color:White;  text-align:center;" | 4th eliminatedof Miss Chile Project
|bgcolor="gray"|
|bgcolor="khaki" style="text-align: center;" |4 ep.
|-
|bgcolor=""| Margaret StevensonPublic Relationer.
| align="center" |22
| align="center" |
| style="background:Red;color:White; text-align:center;" | 3rd eliminatedof Miss Chile Project
|bgcolor="gray"|
|bgcolor="khaki" style="text-align: center;" |3 ep.
|-
|bgcolor=""| Dominique VasseurModel.
| align="center" |20
| align="center" |
| style="background:Red;color:White; text-align:center;" | 1st Eliminatedof Miss Chile Project
|bgcolor="gray"|
|bgcolor="khaki" style="text-align: center;" |1 ep.
|-
|bgcolor=""| María Belén JerezModel and odontology student.
| align="center" |22
| align="center" |
| style="background:Purple;color:White; text-align:center;" | Withdrewby personal motivation
|bgcolor="gray"|
|bgcolor="khaki" style="text-align: center;" |1 ep.
|}

Notes

General Results 

 Candidate won episode’s challenge.
 Candidate won episode’s  challenge and earned a prize.
 Candidate didn’t won episode’s challenge, but still in game, is saved.
 Candidate lost episode’s challenge and is nominated.
 Candidate lost episode’s challenge, is nominated and finishes at the three worst places of the episode.
 Candidate lost episode’s challenge, is nominated and finishes at the three worst places of the episode, but is saved by judges.
 Candidate is eliminated of the competition.
 Candidate withdrew of the competition.
 Candidate finishes between 4th and 8th place.
 Candidate finishes as the Second Runner-up.
 Candidate finishes as the First Runner-up.
 Candidate won Miss Chile Project.

Final Show

First Challenge: Talent Show

Second Challenge: Interview with Judges

Third Challenge: Silence Cabin

Pageant Notes
 Florencia Dunnage participated in Miss Universo Chile 2013, where she became the 1st Runner-up
 Charlotte Molina participated in Miss Earth Chile 2013, where she became the 1st Runner-up. Also, Molina won Miss Supranational Chile 2014 and placed Top 20 in Miss Supranational 2014 pageant.
 María Belén Jerez was appointed as Miss Universo Chile 2015 by Luciano Marocchino, National Director of MU Chile.

References

External links

2013
2013 beauty pageants
2013 in Chile